Noël Blank is a Canadian short film, directed by Jean-François Rivard and released in 2003. The film stars Gilles Pelletier as Eddy, a man with Alzheimer's disease who temporarily leaves his nursing home to experience what is likely to be his last family Christmas. The cast also includes Sylvain Marcel, Pascale Desrochers and Patrice Dussault.

The film's title is a play on words, blending "Noël blanc", the French-language translation of the phrase "White Christmas", with the English-language word "blank".

The film won the Genie Award for Best Live Action Short Drama at the 24th Genie Awards.

References

External links
 

2003 films
2003 drama films
Best Live Action Short Drama Genie and Canadian Screen Award winners
Films about Alzheimer's disease
Quebec films
French-language Canadian films
Canadian drama short films
2000s Canadian films